Saint-Coulitz is a commune in the Finistère department of Brittany in north-western France.

Population
Inhabitants of Saint-Coulitz are called in French Saint-Coulitziens.

See also
Communes of the Finistère department
 Kofi Yamgnane (b. 1945), former mayor of the village.
Parc naturel régional d'Armorique

References

External links

Official website 
Mayors of Finistère Association 

Communes of Finistère